Guo Wei (born 7 November 1969) is a Chinese retired ice hockey player and former member of the Chinese national team. She represented China in the women's ice hockey tournament at the 1998 Winter Olympics in Nagano and at the 1997 IIHF Women's World Championship.

References

External links
 
 

1969 births
Living people
Chinese women's ice hockey forwards
Ice hockey players at the 1998 Winter Olympics
Olympic ice hockey players of China
Sportspeople from Harbin